Miguel Angel de la Hoz Piloto (born October 2, 1938 in Havana, Cuba) is a former Major League Baseball infielder.

He was signed by the Cleveland Indians as an amateur free agent before the 1958 season, and played for the Indians (1960–1963), Milwaukee Braves / Atlanta Braves (1964–1967), and Cincinnati Reds (1969). He was a primarily a utility player.

He made his major league debut at age 21 on July 22, 1960 for the Indians in a 6-4 loss to the Boston Red Sox at Fenway Park. Starting at shortstop and batting seventh, he notched his first career hit, a fourth-inning single off Ike Delock.

After four seasons with the Indians, he was traded to the Milwaukee Braves on April 1, 1964. He played four seasons with the Braves, the last two of which came after their move to Atlanta. He did not play in the majors in 1968, and finished his career in 1969, playing just one game with the Cincinnati Reds.

De la Hoz started a career high 43 games in 1960, his rookie season, and 214 in all, with 83 coming at third base, 70 at second base, 60 at shortstop, and one in left field. He did his best work at second base, fielding .972 in 119 appearances. He was used often as a pinch hitter throughout his career.

One game for which de la Hoz is well remembered took place on July 8, 1965 while playing for the Milwaukee Braves. He hit a pinch home run in the bottom of the 8th inning against Dave Giusti of the Houston Astros, tied the game in the bottom of the 9th with an RBI single off Jim Owens, and singled and scored against Ron Taylor in the bottom of the 12th on a Frank Bolling single as the Braves won, 9–8.

De la Hoz's career batting totals for 494 games include 280 hits, 25 home runs, 115 runs batted in, 116 runs scored, a .251 batting average, and a slugging percentage of .365.

He was a 2010 inductee into the Cuban Sports Hall of Fame (El Salón de la Fama del Deporte Cubano).

References

External links
, or Baseball Reference (Minors), or Retrosheet, or Baseball Library, or Pura Pelota

1938 births
Living people
Almendares (baseball) players
Atlanta Braves players
Cincinnati Reds players
Cleveland Indians players
Detroit Tigers scouts
Indianapolis Indians players
Jacksonville Suns players
Major League Baseball infielders
Major League Baseball players from Cuba
Cuban expatriate baseball players in the United States
Milwaukee Braves players
Minot Mallards players
Mobile Bears players
Reading Indians players
Richmond Braves players
San Diego Padres (minor league) players
Baseball players from Havana
Tiburones de La Guaira players
Cuban expatriate baseball players in Venezuela
Tigres de Aragua players
Toronto Maple Leafs (International League) players